André Sterling (March 30, 1924 - April 14, 2018) was a Belgian civil engineer, professor emeritus at the Université Libre de Bruxelles and academician of the Belgian Royal Academy for Overseas Sciences, the last Belgian federal academy.

Career 
Sterling was lead engineer during the works that have succeeded the floodings of 1953 (that were responsible for hundreds of death in the Netherlands and about 60 deaths in Belgium). He became director of the Belgian state hydraulic laboratory (once in Borgerhout, Belgium) and was the founder of the Walloon hydraulic laboratory and secretary general of the Ministry of public works.

His entire work is being digitized and will be put online under a CC-BY-SA licence compatible with  Wikipedia in a Digithèque (much as Digithèque Pierre Gilbert) that will be inaugurated in Brussels on 5 December 2015.

He was a member of the Belgian Royal Academy for Overseas Sciences (ARSOM). and later became director of this Academy.

Sterling died on April 14, 2018.

References

External links 
 
 Floodings in The Netherlands in 1953

1924 births
2018 deaths
Engineers from Brussels
Academic staff of the Free University of Brussels (1834–1969)
Free University of Brussels (1834–1969) alumni
Belgian civil engineers
Hydraulic engineers
20th-century Belgian engineers